James A. Gibb (born 6 May 1912, date of death unknown) was a Northern Irish amateur footballer, who played for Cliftonville as an inside forward. He scored on his only appearance for Ireland, in 3–2 win over Wales in March 1936. Gibb was a standby member of Great Britain's 1936 Summer Olympics squad.

References

1912 births
Association footballers from Northern Ireland
NIFL Premiership players

Association football inside forwards
Place of birth missing
Cliftonville F.C. players
Northern Ireland amateur international footballers
Date of death missing
Pre-1950 IFA international footballers